The Tetens equation is an equation to calculate the saturation vapour pressure of water over liquid and ice.  It is named after its creator, O. Tetens who was an early German meteorologist.  He published his equation in 1930, and while the publication itself is rather obscure, the equation is widely known among meteorologists and climatologists because of its ease of use and relative accuracy at temperatures within the normal ranges of natural weather conditions.

The equation is structurally identical to the August-Roche-Magnus equation, but the coefficients differ.

Formula
Monteith and Unsworth (2008) provide Tetens' formula for temperatures above 0 °C:

where temperature  is in degrees Celsius (°C) and saturation vapor pressure  is in kilopascals (kPa).  According to Monteith and Unsworth, "Values of saturation vapour pressure from Tetens' formula are within 1 Pa of exact values up to 35 °C."

Murray (1967) provides Tetens' equation for temperatures below 0 °C:

See also
Vapour pressure of water
Antoine equation
Arden Buck equation
Lee–Kesler method
Goff–Gratch equation

References

Meteorological concepts
Thermodynamic equations